Dmytro Dmytrovych Sydor (also known as Pop Sydor, born March 29, 1955 in Mukachevo Raion) is a Rusyn archpriest of the Cathedral of Christ the Saviour in Uzhhorod. The cathedral belongs to the Ukrainian Orthodox Church (Moscow Patriarchate). 

In 1971 Sydor graduated the Uzhhorod Institute with specialist "Electronic instrument". After that he worked at a Soviet military company in Mukachevo "Mukachevpribor" that was supplying equipment for nuclear submarines. In 1982 he graduated Moscow Theological Academy and is a Candidate of Theology. Sydor is also notable as a politician. He is a member of Zakarpattia Oblast Council since 2002. He is the chairman of the Soym of Subcarpathian Rusins (Congress of Carpathian Ruthenians, Сойм підкарпатських русинів), an association of the Rusin organizations of Zakarpattia Oblast. One of the movement's goals is the autonomy of Subcarpathian Ruthenia within Ukraine.

In 2008 he was accused of separatist activities and questioned by the Security Service of Ukraine as part of the criminal investigations of the "threat to state integrity". Sydor denied the accusation saying that he speaks for the autonomy within Ukraine, rather than for a separate state. 

Some local media claim that Sydor's movement is subsidized from Russia.

In 2012 he was convicted to three years in prison conditionally for separatism (encroachment on territorial integrity). According to internet publisher "Newsru", earlier in 2008 the Zakarpattia Rusyns appealed to Russia to recognize independence of Subcarpathian Ruthenia from Ukraine.

References

1955 births
Living people
People from Zakarpattia Oblast
Rusyn people
20th-century Eastern Orthodox priests
21st-century Eastern Orthodox priests
Russian Eastern Orthodox priests